The Chow Chow Bridge was an early, wooden cable-stayed bridge crossing the Quinault River on the Quinault Indian Reservation near Taholah, Grays Harbor County, Washington. It was built for the first time in 1952 and finally removed in 1988. Frank Milward designed the bridge for Aloha Lumber Company.

The bridge collapsed three times and was rebuilt twice. Timbers were made into cedar shakes for the tribal center in Taholah after the final 1988 collapse. It was one of the first cable-stayed bridges in the U.S., and the first in Washington.

In 1971, the bridge was closed by Joe DeLaCruz and other Quinault in protest of unfair resource extraction on the reservation.

See also
List of bridges documented by the Historic American Engineering Record in Washington (state)

References

Sources

External links

Cable-stayed bridges
Bridges completed in 1952
Transportation buildings and structures in Grays Harbor County, Washington
Former National Register of Historic Places in Washington (state)
Historic American Engineering Record in Washington (state)
Quinault
National Register of Historic Places in Grays Harbor County, Washington